is a video game compilation developed by Now Production for PlayStation in 1996-1997. It is the third game in the Namco Museum series.

Compilation
The following six video games in this compilation are included:
 Galaxian (1979)
 Dig Dug (1982)
 Ms. Pac-Man (1982)
 Phozon (1983)
 Pole Position II (1983)
 The Tower of Druaga (1984)

Reception

The game received average reviews. Next Generation said, "With two volumes still to come, Namco is clearly stretching a series that could have been condensed into three discs without the superfluous B titles. But the number of true classics in Volume 3 outweigh the ones that never should have been unearthed." In Japan, Famitsu gave it a score of 27 out of 40.

Dr. Zombie of GamePro called it "must-have arcade fun that will provide hours of classic gaming until Namco preps Volume 4. Thanks for the memories, Namco!"

Notes

References

External links
 

1996 video games
Bandai Namco video game compilations
Multiplayer and single-player video games
Namco games
Now Production games
Sony Interactive Entertainment games
Video games developed in Japan